Annai Meenambal Sivaraj (26 December 1904 – 30 November 1992) was the first Scheduled Caste women president of the South India Scheduled Castes Federation (SCF). She presided over the SCF Women's Conference held at Madras, in 1944, which was attended by B. R. Ambedkar. She also presided over the All India SCF Women's Conference held at Bombay, on 6 May 1945.

She was also one of the radical feminist leaders of the Self-Respect Movement.In 1937, Meenambal Sivaraj presided over the Tinnelveli District Third Adi Dravida Conference.

References

Politicians from Chennai
Women in Tamil Nadu politics
20th-century Indian women politicians
20th-century Indian politicians
1904 births
1992 deaths
Scheduled Castes Federation politician
Indian expatriates in British Burma